Hermanus Angelkot may refer to:

Hermanus Angelkot senior, (1648–c. 1713), Dutch writer
Hermanus Angelkot junior, (1688–1727), Dutch pharmacist who also wrote poems and plays, son of the above 

nl:Hermanus Angelkot